Watusi Rodeo is the debut independent EP from the American jangle pop group Guadalcanal Diary. It was released in 1983 on DB Records. The EP was included by Rhino Handmade on the same CD as the reissue of the band's debut LP, Walking in the Shadow of the Big Man.

"Watusi Rodeo," a song that appears on Walking in the Shadow of the Big Man, was often used to close the band's live performances.

Track listing
 "Michael Rockefeller" (Murray Attaway) – 4:52
 "Liwa Wechi" (Miriam Makeba) – 2:50
 "I Wish I Killed John Wayne" (Attaway, Walls) – 3:20
 "Dead Eyes" (Attaway, Walls) – 3:12)

References

Guadalcanal Diary (band) albums
1984 EPs